Hidrolândia is a municipality in central Goiás state, Brazil. Hidrolândia is a large producer of poultry and eggs.

Location
It belongs to the Goiânia Microregion, which contains more than one million seven hundred thousand inhabitants.

Considered the capital of the jaboticaba (a blackish tropical fruit—Myrciaria cauliflora) See Jaboticaba because of the great quantity of jaboticaba trees in the region, Hidrolândia is also known as the city of waters.  The concentration of springs, bathing spots and rivers in the area gave the city this name.

History
Hidrolândia began in 1895 when lands were donated to build a chapel dedicated to Santo Antônio.  In 1896 it was elevated to a district with the name Santo Antônio das Grimpas belonging to Pouso Alto, which later became Piracanjuba.  In 1930 it became a municipality with the name Hidrolândia, land of waters.  With the construction of the new capital in Goiânia it became part of that city with the name "Grimpas".  In 1948 it became municipality with its present name.

Political and Demographic Data
Eligible voters: 11,844 (December 2007)
Mayor: Wilton Moreira Alves (January 2005)
Vice-mayor: Nivaldo Vieira Vaz
Councilmembers: 09
Population growth rate 2000/2007: 0.97%
Population in 1980: 8,559     
Population in 1991: 10,254         
Urban population in 2007: 9,615   
Rural population in 2007: 4,389

The economy
The economy of the city is based on dairy cattle.  There are large dairies in the area, supplying milk products to Goiânia.  Local farmers also produce oranges, manioc, corn, tangerines, sugarcane, watermelon, pineapple, bananas, coconuts and rice.

Economic Data
Industrial units: 37 (June 2007)
Retail units: 108 (August 2007)
Banking institutions: BRADESCO S.A. - Banco Itaú S.A. (1 June 2005)
Dairies: Marajoara Ind. de Laticínios Ltda. (7 June 2005)
Meatpacking plant or egg collection unit: Gransapa Ovos Ltda. (7 June 2005)
Cooperatives: - Coop. Eletrif. Desenv. Rural de Hidrolândia Ltda - CEDRHIL - Coop. de Produção Artesanal de Hidrolândia-COOPERARTH 
(17/06/2005)

Main agricultural activities:
Cattle raising: 86,550 head (2006)
Poultry: 601,480
Agriculture: rice, sugarcane, coffee, coconuts, manioc, corn, oranges, and soybeans. Statistics are from IBGE

Education and Health
Literacy rate: 87.0%
Infant mortality rate: 25.35 in 1,000 live births
Schools: 23 (2006)
Classrooms: 108
Teachers: 186
Students: 4,195
Hospitals: 01 (2007)
Hospital beds: 25
Walk-in public health clinics: 08

Human Development Index:  0.736
State ranking:  124 (out of 242 municipalities)
National ranking:  2,280 (out of 5,507 municipalities)

For the complete list see Frigoletto

See also 
 List of municipalities in Goiás

References

Frigoletto

Municipalities in Goiás